In mathematics, specifically in homotopy theory and (higher) category theory, coherency is the standard that equalities or diagrams must satisfy when they hold "up to homotopy" or "up to isomorphism".

The adjectives such as "pseudo-" and "lax-" are used to refer to the fact equalities are weakened in coherent ways; e.g., pseudo-functor, pseudoalgebra.

Coherent isomorphism 
In some situations, isomorphisms need to be chosen in a coherent way. Often, this can be achieved by choosing canonical isomorphisms. But in some cases, such as prestacks, there can be several canonical isomorphisms and there might not be an obvious choice among them.

In practice, coherent isomorphisms arise by weakening equalities; e.g., strict associativity may be replaced by associativity via coherent isomorphisms. For example, via this process, one gets the notion of a weak 2-category from that of a strict 2-category.

Replacing coherent isomorphisms by equalities is usually called strictification or rectification.

Coherence theorem 
Mac Lane's coherence theorem states, roughly, that if diagrams of certain types commute, then diagrams of all types commute. A simple proof of that theorem can be obtained using the permutoassociahedron, a polytope whose combinatorial structure appears implicitly in Mac Lane's proof.

There are several generalizations of Mac Lane's coherence theorem. Each of them has the rough form that "every weak structure of some sort is equivalent to a stricter one".

Homotopy coherence

See also 
Coherence condition
Canonical isomorphism

Notes

References 

 § 5. of 
 
 Ch. 5 of

External links 
https://ncatlab.org/nlab/show/homotopy+coherent+diagram

Homotopy theory